State Road 519 (NM 519) is a  state highway in the US state of New Mexico. NM 519's southern terminus is at NM 111 south of La Madera, and the northern terminus is at the end of state maintenance and continues as County Route 222 in Las Tablas.

Major intersections

See also

References

519
Transportation in Rio Arriba County, New Mexico